General Khalid Shameem Wynne (28 August 1953 – 30 December 2017), was a four-star General in the Pakistan Army who served as the 14th Chairman of the Joint Chiefs of Staff Committee appointed in 2010 until retiring on 8 October 2013.

Early life and education

Wynne came from an army background and hailed from the soldier-producing area of Sialkot. His father, Lieutenant Colonel Arshad Shameem Wynne served in the Pakistan Army until 1972. His unit was also the 20th battalion of the Punjab Regiment. 

Khalids father, Arshad was a close aid to Quaid-e-Azam Muhammad Ali Jinnah.

Khalid obtained his earlier education from various cantonment schools all over Pakistan and joined Cadet College Hasan Abdal as special entry in 1969 after matriculation.

Military career

In 1971, Wynne joined the Army after his intermediate examination. He passed out in April 1972 in the 1st Special War Course to join his father's battalion, 20 Punjab Regiment. He graduated from Command and Staff College, Quetta; Bundeswehr Command and Staff College, Hamburg, Germany; and the National Defence University, Islamabad. He held a master's degree in War Studies from Quaid-i-Azam University.

Command appointments
Wynne had held various command, staff and instructional appointments during his 42-year military career. He had been a brigade major of two infantry brigades. He had commanded his own 20th Battalion of the Punjab Regiment, two infantry brigades, including the 323 Infantry Brigade in Siachen (also known as Siachen Brigade), the 41st Infantry Division in Quetta and the Southern Command in Quetta.

Staff and instructional appointments

On the academic part, he had held various instructional designations and remained on the faculty of School of Infantry and Tactics, Quetta; Command and Staff College, Quetta and Pakistan Military Academy, Kakul.

Wynne also remained Chief of Staff in a Corps Headquarters and Commandant of the School of Infantry and Tactics in Quetta. He had also served in General Staff directorate, staying as Deputy Chief of General Staff (DCGS) from 2006 to 2007 and then as Chief of General Staff from April 2010 to October 2010.

Chairman Joint Chiefs of Staff Committee

Prior to his promotion, the official statement noted that "General Wynne was appointed as Chairman Joint Chiefs of Staff Committee by President Asif Ali Zardari, on the advice of Prime Minister Yousuf Raza Gilani."

Before this appointment, Wynne was serving as the Chief of General Staff (CGS) at the Army GHQ since April 2010. He also served as field operational Commander of the XII Corps in Quetta from 2007 to 2010, overseeing the Baloch insurgency and the fallout of the war in the Tribal Areas.

At the onset of the initial retirement dates of Generals Ashfaq Parvez Kayani and Tariq Majid at the end of 2010, Wynne would have been the senior-most general in the Pakistan Army and thus a candidate for a four-star post.

In September 2010, it was announced that Lieutenant General Wynne would be promoted as four-star general and would replace General Tariq Majid as the Chairman Joint Chiefs of Staff Committee on 8 October 2010. He retired on 8 October 2013, after 42 years in active services.

Death

Khalid Shameem Wynne died while travelling to Lahore on 30 December 2017, when a tyre on the SUV they were travelling in burst near Chakri Interchange on the Rawalpindi–Lahore motorway. The injured were taken to Combined Military Hospital, Rawalpindi. Pakistani Prime Minister Shahid Khaqan Abbasi and Chief Minister Punjab Shehbaz Sharif expressed their grief over Wynne's death.

Wynne was laid to rest in Lahore on 1 January 2018. His funeral prayer was attended by COAS Gen Qamar Javed Bajwa, former president Asif Ali Zardari and former army chief Gen Raheel Sharif.

Awards and decorations

References

External links

Wynne's Profile at Abdalians Home Page
The Shangri-la dialogue (Ikram Sehgal)
Wynne at 2008 Land Forces Symposium
Wynne Visit to Earthquake-affected Areas in Balochistan

 

|-
 

1953 births
2017 deaths
Chairmen Joint Chiefs of Staff Committee
Pakistani generals
Cadet College Hasan Abdal alumni
National Defence University, Pakistan alumni
Academic staff of the National Defence University, Pakistan
Punjab Regiment officers
Academic staff of Quaid-i-Azam University
Road incident deaths in Pakistan
Pakistani military personnel of the Indo-Pakistani War of 1971
Bundeswehr Command and Staff College alumni
People from Abbottabad District